Ramondbreen is a glacier in Wedel Jarlsberg Land at Spitsbergen, Svalbard. The glacier has a length of about two kilometers, and is part of the Recherchebreen glacier complex. It is named after Arctic explorer Gontaud Ramond.

References

Glaciers of Spitsbergen